

Plants

Sponges

Cnidarians

New taxa

Research
 Revision of tabulate-like fossils from before the latest Middle Ordovician is published by Elias, Lee & Pratt (2020), who reject the interpretation of these fossils as true tabulate corals.
 Drake, Whitelegge & Jacobs (2020) report the first recovery, sequencing, and identification of fossil biomineral proteins from a Pleistocene fossil invertebrate (the stony coral Orbicella annularis).

Arthropods

Bryozoans

Brachiopods

New taxa

Research
 A study on the mode of life of Paleozoic strophomenatans is published by Stanley (2020), who argues that nearly all strophomenatans lived infaunally.
 A study on the paleobiogeography of Early−Middle Devonian (Pragian−Eifelian) brachiopods from West Gondwana, aiming to determine any potential controls that may have driven bioregionalization, is published by Penn-Clarke & Harper (2020).
 A study on the phylogenetic relationships and ecomorphologic diversification of Mesozoic spiriferinids is published by Guo, Chen & Harper (2020).

Molluscs

Echinoderms

New taxa

Research
 A study on morphological diversification of echinoderms and evolutionary mechanisms underlying the establishment of echinoderm body plans during the early Paleozoic is published by Deline et al. (2020).
 A study on the locomotion of cornute stylophorans, based on data from a specimen of Phyllocystis crassimarginata from the Ordovician (Tremadocian) Saint-Chinian Formation (France), is published by Clark et al. (2020).
 A study on the speciation and dispersal of the diploporan blastozoans through the Ordovician period is published by Lam, Sheffield & Matzke (2020).
 A study on the evolutionary history of eublastoid blastozoans is published by Bauer (2020).
 A study on the anatomy and phylogenetic relationships of Eumorphocystis is published by Guensburg et al. (2020), who consider this taxon to be a blastozoan far removed from crinoids, contrary to the results of the study of Sheffield & Sumrall (2019).
 A study on the phylogeny of the crown group of Echinoidea, based on both phylogenomic and paleontological data, is published by Koch & Thompson (2020).
 A study on the structure of the arms and on probable locomotion strategies of Devonian brittle stars from the Hunsrück Slate (Germany) is published by Clark, Hutchinson & Briggs (2020).

Conodonts

New taxa

Research
 Evidence of variations in crystallography and microstructure due to both ontogeny and element type within the conodont feeding apparatus of Dapsilodus obliquicostatus is presented by Shohel et al. (2020), who evaluate the implications of their findings for the knowledge of the integrity of conodont apatite as a recorder of seawater chemistry.
 A study aiming to determine whether the repeated emergence of similar morphologies in the dental elements of Permian conodonts belonging to the genus Sweetognathus is an example of parallel evolution is published by Petryshen et al. (2020).

Fishes

Amphibians

Reptiles

Synapsids

Non-mammalian synapsids

New taxa

Research
 A study on the evolution of the well-defined morphological regions of the vertebral column and of vertebral functional diversity in synapsids is published by Jones et al. (2020).
 A study aiming to determine the resting metabolic rates and the thermometabolic regimes (endothermy or ectothermy) in eight non-mammalian synapsids is published by Faure-Brac & Cubo (2020).
 A study on the shoulder musculature in extant Argentine black and white tegu and Virginia opossum, evaluating its implications for reconstructions of the shoulder musculature in non-mammalian synapsids, is published by Fahn-Lai, Biewener & Pierce (2020).
 A study aiming to determine whether a vicariance pattern can explain early synapsid evolution is published by Brikiatis (2020).
 Mann et al. (2020) reinterpret Carboniferous taxon Asaphestera platyris Steen (1934) from the Joggins locality (Nova Scotia, Canada) as the earliest unambiguous synapsid in the fossil record reported so far.
 A study on the long bone histology of varanopids from the lower Permian Richards Spur locality (Oklahoma, United States), evaluating its implications for the knowledge of the paleobiology of early synapsids, is published by Huttenlocker & Shelton (2020).
 Mann & Reisz (2020) report a new hyper-elongated neural spine of Echinerpeton intermedium from the Pennsylvanian-aged Sydney Mines Formation (Nova Scotia, Canada), indicating a wider distribution of hyper-elongation of vertebral neural spines in early synapsids than previously known.
 A study on the histology of vertebral centra of Edaphosaurus and Dimetrodon is published by Agliano, Sander & Wintrich (2020).
 A study on the anatomy of the holotype skull of Tetraceratops insignis and on the phylogenetic relationships of this taxon is published by Spindler (2020).
 A study comparing the oxygen and carbon stable isotope compositions of tooth and bone apatite of Endothiodon and Tropidostoma, and aiming to determine the ecology and diet of Endothiodon, is published by Rey et al. (2020).
 Whitney & Sidor (2020) compare the frequency and patterns of growth marks in tusks of Lystrosaurus from polar Antarctica and from the non-polar Karoo Basin of South Africa living ~250 Mya, and report evidence of prolonged stress interpreted as indicative of torpor in polar specimens. This could be the oldest evidence of a hibernation-like state in a vertebrate animal and indicates that torpor arose in vertebrates before mammals and dinosaurs evolved.
 A study on the skull length and growth patterns of the four South African Lystrosaurus species (L. maccaigi, L. curvatus, L. murrayi and L. declivis), aiming to determine whether the end-Permian mass extinction caused the Lilliput effect in Lystrosaurus species from the Karoo Basin and to infer their lifestyle, is published by Botha (2020).
 A study aiming to examine the basis for claims that the genus Lystrosaurus is a disaster taxon is published by Modesto (2020).
 A study on tooth serrations in a Permian gorgonopsian from Zambia, identifying the occurrence of denticles and interdental folds forming the cutting edges in the teeth which were previously thought to be unique to theropod dinosaurs and some other archosaurs, is published by Whitney et al. (2020).
 Redescription of the skull of Lycosuchus vanderrieti, providing new information on the endocranial anatomy of this taxon, is published by Pusch et al. (2020).
 A review of the fossil record of Triassic non-mammaliaform cynodonts from western Gondwana and its importance for the knowledge of the origin of mammals, focusing on taxa known from Argentina, is published by Abdala et al. (2020).
 A study on the tooth replacement in Galesaurus planiceps is published by Norton et al. (2020).
 The third specimen of Prozostrodon brasiliensis, providing novel information on the anatomy of this taxon, is described by Kerber et al. (2020).

Mammals

Other animals

New taxa

Research
 A study on the taphonomy of three-dimensionally preserved specimens of Charnia from the White Sea, and on their implications for the knowledge of rangeomorph feeding and physiology, is published by Butterfield (2020).
 A study on the morphology and likely mode of life of Beothukis mistakensis is published by McIlroy et al. (2020).
 Evidence of preservation of internal anatomical structures in cloudinomorph fossils from the Ediacaran Wood Canyon Formation (Nevada, United States) is reported by Schiffbauer et al. (2020), who interpret these structures as probable digestive tracts, and evaluate their implications for the knowledge of the phylogenetic relationships of cloudinomorphs.
 Fossils of Dickinsonia identical with D. tenuis from the Ediacara Member of the Rawnsley Quartzite in South Australia are reported from the late Ediacaran Maihar Sandstone of the Bhander Group (India; found in the roof of Auditorium Cave at Bhimbetka rock shelters) by Retallack et al. (2020), who interpret this finding as confirming the assembly of Gondwana by 550 Ma; however, Meert et al. (2023) subsequently reinterpreted purported fossil material of Dickinsonia as an impression resulting from decay of a modern beehive.
 New specimens of Mafangscolex, providing the first detailed information on the anatomy of a proboscis in palaeoscolecids, are described from the Cambrian Xiaoshiba Lagerstätte (Kunming, China) by Yang et al. (2020).
 A study on the type material of a putative Ordovician annelid Haileyia adhaerens is published by Muir & Botting (2020) who find no evidence indicating that H. adhaerens is an annelid, or even a recognizable fossil.
 New hyolithid specimens preserving helens and interior soft tissues, including muscle scars and digestive tracts, are described from the Guanshan Biota (Cambrian Stage 4; Yunnan, China) by Liu et al. (2020).
 Redescription of Acosmia maotiania based on data from new and historic fossil material is published by Howard et al. (2020), who interpret this animal as a stem group ecdysozoan.
 Two types of microscopic reticulate cuticular patterns are described in Cambrian stem-group scalidophorans from the Kuanchuanpu Formation (China) by Wang et al. (2020), who argue that these cuticular networks replicate the cell boundaries of the epidermis.
 A study on the anatomy and phylogenetic relationships of Facivermis yunnanicus, based on data from the holotype and new specimens, is published by Howard et al. (2020), who consider this species to be a luolishaniid lobopodian.
 New type of a compound eye is identified in specimens of "Anomalocaris" briggsi from the Cambrian Emu Bay Shale (Australia) by Paterson, Edgecombe & García-Bellido (2020), who interpret the eye morphology of "A." briggsi as suggestive of this animal being a mesopelagic species, capable of inhabiting depths of several hundred meters, and likely using its acute, light-sensitive eyes to detect plankton in dim down-welling light.
 An isolated frontal appendage of a miniature hurdiid radiodont (less than half the size of the next smallest radiodont frontal appendage discovered so far) is described from the Ordovician (Tremadocian) Dol-cyn-Afon Formation (Wales, United Kingdom) by Pates et al. (2020), representing the first radiodont reported from the UK, the first record of this group from the palaeocontinent Avalonia, and the first from an environment dominated by sponges rather than euarthropods.
 Barrios-de Pedro, Osuna & Buscalioni (2020) report the discovery of trematode and nematode eggs in coprolites from the Barremian Las Hoyas fossil site (Spain).

Foraminifera

Other organisms

New taxa

Research
 A study on fossilized biopolymers in 3.5–3.3 Ga microbial mats from the Barberton Greenstone Belt (South Africa) is published by Hickman-Lewis, Westall & Cavalazzi (2020), who interpret their findings as indicating that Bacteria and Archaea flourished together in Earth's earliest ecosystems.
 Putative ciliate fossils from the Cryogenian Taishir Formation (Tsagaan Olom Group, Zavkhan Terrane, Mongolia) are reinterpreted as more likely to be algal reproductive structures by Cohen, Vizcaíno & Anderson (2020), who also report the first occurrence of these fossils in the earliest Ediacaran Ol Formation.
 The discovery of fungal fossils in a 810 to 715 million year old dolomitic shale from the Mbuji-Mayi Supergroup (Democratic Republic of the Congo) is reported by Bonneville et al. (2020), representing the oldest, molecularly identified remains of Fungi reported so far.
 Specimens of Palaeopascichnus linearis living before the Gaskiers glaciation are described from marine strata within the Rocky Harbour Formation by Liu & Tindal (2020), representing the oldest documented macrofossils from the Ediacaran successions of Newfoundland reported so far.
 A study on the developmental biology and phylogenetic relationships of Helicoforamina wenganica is published by Yin et al. (2020).
 A study on the morphology and affinities of a putative early sponge Namapoikia rietoogensis is published by Mehra et al. (2020), who argue that Namapoikia lacked the physical characteristics expected of an animal.
 A study on the morphology and inner ultrastructure of exceptionally preserved chitinozoan specimens from the Ordovician of Estonia, the United States and Russia is published by Liang et al. (2020), who interpret their findings as evidence of a protist affinity of chitinozoans.

Trace fossils
 A study on patterns of ecosystem engineering behaviors across the Permian-Triassic boundary, as indicated by data from trace fossils, and on their possible impact on ecosystem recovery in the benthic environment in the aftermath of the Permian–Triassic extinction event is published by Cribb & Bottjer (2020).
 New fossil tracks, probably produced by a pterygote insect, are described from the Upper Jurassic-Lower Cretaceous Botucatu Formation (Brazil) by Peixoto et al. (2020), who name a new ichnotaxon Paleohelcura araraquarensis, and evaluate the implications of this finding for the knowledge of ecological relationships within the Botucatu paleodesert.
 A new assemblage of nests produced by social insects is described from the Brushy Basin Member of the Upper Jurassic Morrison Formation (Utah, United States) by Smith, Loewen & Kirkland (2020), who name a new ichnotaxon Eopolis ekdalei.
 New tetrapod trackways are described from the Tapinocephalus Assemblage Zone of the South African Karoo Basin by Cisneros et al. (2020), who interpret these tracks as produced by small amphibians, and consider them to be evidence that the diversity of Guadalupian amphibians of the Karoo Basin was greater than indicated by body fossils alone.
 Mujal & Schoch (2020) describe amphibian tracks from the Middle Triassic Erfurt Formation (Germany, probably produced by capitosaurid temnospondyls, and evaluate the implications of this finding for the knowledge of the locomotion and habitats of temnospondyls.
 Fossil tracks likely produced by early amniotes are described from the Carboniferous (Pennsylvanian) Manakacha Formation (Arizona, United States) by Rowland, Caputo & Jensen (2020), who interpret these tracks as evidence of early adaptation of amniotes to eolian dunefield deserts, as well as the first documented occurrence of a lateral-sequence gait in the pre-Miocene tetrapod fossil record.
 Revision of Pachypes-like footprints from the Cisuralian–Guadalupian of Europe and North America is published by Marchetti et al. (2020), who date the earliest known occurrence of Pachypes to the Artinskian, interpret the footprints belonging to the ichnospecies Pachypes ollieri as produced by nycteroleter pareiasauromorphs, and argue that the earliest occurrences of pareiasauromorph footprints precede the earliest occurrence of this group in the skeletal record by at least 10 million years.
 The first known fossil example of an iguana nesting burrow is reported from the Pleistocene Grotto Beach Formation (The Bahamas) by Martin et al. (2020).
 Fossil tracks possibly produced by a monjurosuchid-like choristoderan are described from the Albian Daegu Formation (South Korea) by Lee, Kong & Jung (2020), who attempt to determine the trackmaker's locomotory posture on land, and name a new ichnotaxon Novapes ulsanensis.
 New Early Triassic archosauriform track assemblage is described from the Gardetta Plateau (Western Alps, Italy) by Petti et al. (2020), who interpret this finding as evidence of the presence of archosauriforms at low latitudes soon after the Permian–Triassic extinction event, and name a new ichnotaxon Isochirotherium gardettensis.
 Fossil tracks produced by large crocodylomorphs, possibly moving bipedally, are described from the Lower Cretaceous Jinju Formation (South Korea) by Kim et al. (2020), who name a new ichnotaxon Batrachopus grandis.
 The first probable deinonychosaur (likely troodontid) tracks from Canada are described from the Campanian Wapiti Formation (Alberta) by Enriquez et al. (2020).
 Three sauropod trackways, probably produced by members of Titanosauriformes, are described from the Middle Jurassic (Bathonian) of the Castelbouc cave (France) by Moreau et al. (2020), who name a new ichnotaxon Occitanopodus gandi.
 New dinosaur tracks, including tracks representing the ichnogenus Deltapodus (probably produced by stegosaurians), are described from the Middle Jurassic of the Isle of Skye (Scotland, United Kingdom) by  et al. (2020), expanding known diversity of dinosaur tracks from this locality.
 A review of the Late Cretaceous dinosaur tracksites of Bolivia is published by Meyer et al. (2020), who describe new dinosaur tracksites from the Chuquisaca and Potosi departments, and report parallel trackways of subadult ankylosaurs interpreted as evidence of social behavior amongst these dinosaurs.
 A study on Pleistocene bird tracks from the Cape south coast of South Africa is published by Helm et al. (2020), who report six tracksites with tracks produced by large birds, possibly indicating the existence of large Pleistocene forms of extant bird taxa.
 Mazin & Pouech (2020) describe non-pterodactyloid pterosaur tracks from the ichnological site known as "the Pterosaur Beach of Crayssac" (Tithonian; south-western France), evaluate the implications of these tracks for the knowledge of the terrestrial capabilities of non-pterodactyloid pterosaurs, and name a new ichnogenus Rhamphichnus.
 Dinosaur and synapsid tracks are described from the Pliensbachian-Toarcian of the northern main Karoo Basin (South Africa) by Bordy et al. (2020), who interpret these tracks as evidence that dinosaurs and synapsids were among the last inhabitants of the main Karoo Basin some 183 million years ago, and name a new ichnotaxon Afrodelatorrichnus ellenbergeri (likely of ornithischian affinity).
 New complex burrow system produced by geomyid rodents is described from the Oligocene Chilapa Formation (Mexico) by Guerrero-Arenas, Jiménez-Hidalgo & Genise (2020), who name a new ichnotaxon Yaviichnus iniyooensis, and interpret the complexity of these burrows as probable evidence of some degree of gregariousness of their producers.

History of life in general
 Bobrovskiy et al. (2020) and van Maldegem et al. (2020) argue that putative sponge biomarkers can be generated from algal sterols, and interpret their findings as undermining the interpretation of biomarkers found in Precambrian rocks posited as evidence of existence of animals before the latest Ediacaran.
 Liu & Dunn (2020), describe filamentous organic structures preserved among frond-dominated fossil assemblages from the Ediacaran of Newfoundland (Canada), including filaments that appear to directly connect individual specimens of one rangeomorph taxon, and interpret this finding as possible evidence that Ediacaran frondose taxa were clonal.
 A study on the age of the Ediacaran biota from the Conception and St. John's Groups at Mistaken Point Ecological Reserve (Newfoundland, Canada) is published by Matthews et al. (2020).
 Approximately 563-million-year-old Ediacaran biota is reported from the Itajaí Basin (Brazil) by Becker-Kerber et al. (2020), representing the first record of Ediacaran macrofossils from Gondwana in deposits of similar age to the Avalon biota.
 An Ediacaran Lagerstätte with phosphatized animal-like eggs, embryos, acritarchs and cyanobacteria is reported from the Portfjeld Formation (Peary Land, Greenland) by Willman et al. (2020), representing the first record of a Doushantuo type preservation of fossils (with diagenetic phosphate replacement of originally organic material) from Laurentia reported so far.
 A study on biomarkers from Ediacaran sediments in the White Sea area is published by Bobrovskiy et al. (2020), who interpret their findings as indicating that eukaryotic algae were abundant among the food sources available for the Ediacaran biota.
 A study aiming to quantify changes of regional-scale diversity in marine fossils across time and space throughout the Phanerozoic is published by Close et al. (2020).
 A study on the structure of the Phanerozoic fossil record, aiming to determine relative impacts of extinctions and evolutionary radiations on the co-occurrence of species throughout the Phanerozoic, is published by Hoyal Cuthill, Guttenberg & Budd (2020), who argue that their findings refute any direct causal relationship between the proportionally most comparable mass radiations and extinctions.
 A study on the timing of known diversification and extinction events from Cambrian to Triassic, based on data from 11,000 marine fossil species, is published by Fan et al. (2020).
 The discovery of a new, exceptionally-preserved Cambrian biota, with fossils belonging to multiple phyla, is reported from the Guzhangian Longha Formation (Yunnan, China) by Peng et al. (2020).
 A study on changes in body size in skeletal animals from the Siberian Platform through the early Cambrian is published by Zhuravlev & Wood (2020).
 A study on the relationship between body size and extinction risk in the marine fossil record across the past 485 million years is published by Payne & Heim (2020).
 A study on the diversification rates of Ordovician animals living on hard substrates, aiming to determine when they experienced their greatest origination rates, is published by Franeck & Liow (2020).
 New information on the biotic composition of the Silurian Waukesha Lagerstätte (Wisconsin, United States) is presented by Wendruff et al. (2020), who report a biodiversity far richer than previously reported, and explore the taphonomic history of the fossils of this biota.
 A study on the diversity dynamics of the marine brachiopods, bivalves and gastropods throughout the Late Palaeozoic Ice Age is published by Seuss, Roden & Kocsis (2020).
 A study comparing the chemistry of fossil soft tissues of invertebrates and vertebrates from the Carboniferous Mazon Creek fossil beds (Illinois, United States) is published by McCoy et al. (2020), who report Tullimonstrum gregarium as grouping with vertebrates in their analysis.
 A study on the ages of known early–middle Permian tetrapod-bearing geological formations, as indicated by Bayesian tip dating methods, is published by Brocklehurst (2020), who interprets his findings as supporting the occurrence of the Olson's Extinction.
 A study on global infaunal response to the Permian–Triassic extinction event, as indicated by data from trace fossils, is published by Luo et al. (2020).
 A study on changes of marine latitudinal diversity gradient caused by the Permian–Triassic mass extinction is published by Song et al. (2020).
 A study on the latitudinal variation in Late Triassic tetrapod diversity, aiming to determine the relationship between latitudinal species richness and palaeoclimatic conditions, is published by Dunne et al. (2020).
 Description of new fossil material of Late Triassic tetrapods from the Hoyada del Cerro Las Lajas site (Ischigualasto Formation, Argentina), and a study on the age of tetrapod fossils from this site (including fossils of Pisanosaurus mertii) and their implications for the knowledge of the Late Triassic tetrapod evolution, is published by Desojo et al. (2020).
 A review of the evidence of a major change in ecological community structure during the Carnian, focusing on the temporal links of these biological changes with the Carnian Pluvial Event and on the role of volcanic eruptions and associated climate change as a possible trigger, is published by Dal Corso et al. (2020).
 An assemblage of fossilized vomits and coprolites is described from the Upper Triassic (Carnian) Reingraben Shales in Polzberg (Austria) by Lukeneder et al. (2020), who evaluate the implications of these bromalites for the knowledge of pelagic invertebrates-vertebrates trophic chain of the Late Triassic Polzberg biota, and interpret their finding as evidence indicating that the Mesozoic marine revolution has already started in the early Mesozoic.
 A study on the dynamics of the Adamanian/Revueltian faunal turnover, based on fossil data from the Petrified Forest National Park (Arizona, United States), is published by Hayes et al. (2020).
 A study on the palynological record from the Carnian–Norian transition in the western Barents Sea region is published by Klausen, Paterson & Benton (2020), who interpret their findings as indicating that major sea-level changes across the vast delta plains situated in the northern Pangaea might have triggered terrestrial turnovers during the Carnian–Norian transition and facilitated the gradual rise of the dinosaurs to ecosystem dominance.
 Wignall & Atkinson (2020) argue that the Triassic–Jurassic extinction event can be resolved into two distinct, short-lived extinction pulses separated by a several hundred-thousand-year interlude phase.
 A study on changes in shell size of marine bivalves and brachiopods from the Iberian Basin (Spain) across the Early Toarcian Oceanic Anoxic Event, aiming to determine the role of temperature for changes in body size of bivalves and brachiopods, is published by Piazza, Ullmann & Aberhan (2020).
 A study on the impact of warming and disturbance of the carbon cycle during the Toarcian Oceanic Anoxic Event on marine benthic macroinvertebrate assemblages from the Iberian Basin is published by Piazza, Ullmann & Aberhan (2020).
 A study on the persistence and abundance of an association of serpulids and hydroids during the Middle and Late Jurassic is published by Słowiński et al. (2020).
 Foster, Pagnac & Hunt-Foster (2020) describe the Late Jurassic biota from the Little Houston Quarry in the Black Hills of Wyoming, including the vertebrate fauna which is the second-most diverse in the entire Morrison Formation and the most diverse north of Como Bluff.
 A study on the age of the Huajiying Formation (China) and its implications for the knowledge of the timing of appearance and duration of the Jehol Biota is published by Yang et al. (2020).
 A study on the age of the biota from the Cretaceous Burmese amber from Hkamti is published by Xing & Qiu (2020).
 A study on extinction patterns of marine vertebrates during the last 20 million years of the Late Cretaceous, as indicated by fossils from northern Gulf of Mexico, is published by Ikejiri, Lu & Zhang (2020), who report evidence of two separate extinction events: one in the Campanian, and one at the end of the Maastrichtian.
 Rodríguez-Tovar et al. (2020) present evidence from trace fossils from the Chicxulub crater indicating that full recovery of the macrobenthic biota from this area was rapid, with the establishment of a well-developed tiered community within ~700 thousand years.
 A study on the impact of the early Cenozoic hyperthermal events on shallow marine benthic communities, based on data from fossils from the Gulf Coastal Plain, is published by Foster et al. (2020).
 A study on the geology and fauna (including hominins) of the new Mille-Logya site (Afar, Ethiopia) dated to between 2.914 and 2.443 Ma is published by Zeresenay Alemseged et al. (2020), who evaluate the implications of this site for the knowledge of how hominins and other fauna responded to environmental changes during this period.
 Studies on the magnitude and likely causes of megafaunal extinctions in the Indian subcontinent during the late Pleistocene and early Holocene are published by Jukar et al. (2020) and Turvey et al. (2020).
 A new, diverse megafauna assemblage that suffered extinction sometime after 40,100 (±1700) years ago is reported from the South Walker Creek fossil deposits (Queensland, Australia) by Hocknull et al. (2020), who evaluate the implications of this assemblage for prevailing megafauna extinction hypotheses for Sahul.
 A study on ancient DNA of vertebrates and plants recovered from fossils and sediment from Hall's Cave (Edwards Plateau, Texas, United States), evaluating its implications for the knowledge of the climatic fluctuations from the Pleistocene to the Holocene on the local ecosystem, is published by Seersholm et al. (2020).
 A study on the phylogenetic relationships of early amniotes, recovering Parareptilia and Varanopidae as nested within Diapsida, will be published by Ford & Benson (2020), who name a new clade Neoreptilia.
 Regional-scale diversity patterns for terrestrial tetrapods throughout their entire Phanerozoic evolutionary history are presented by Close et al. (2020), who attempt to determine how informative the fossil record is about true global paleodiversity.
 A study on the impact of the appearance and evolution of herbivorous tetrapods on the evolution of land plants from the Carboniferous to the Early Triassic is published by Brocklehurst, Kammerer & Benson (2020).
 A study the terrestrial and marine fossil record of Late Permian to Late Triassic tetrapods, comparing species-level tetrapod biodiversity across latitudinal bins, is published by Allen et al. (2020).
 In a study published by Chiarenza et al. (2020) the two main hypotheses for the mass extinction (the Daccan Traps and the Chicxulub impact) were evaluated using Earth System and Ecologial modelling, confirming that the asteroid impact was the main driver of this extinction while the volcanism might have boosted the recovery instead.
 Bishop, Cuff & Hutchinson (2020) outline a workflow for integrating paleontological data with biomechanical principles and modeling techniques in order to create musculoskeletal models and study locomotor biomechanics of extinct animals, using Coelophysis as a case study.
 Saitta et al. (2020) propose a framework for studying sexual dimorphism in non-avian dinosaurs and other extinct taxa, focusing on likely secondary sexual traits and testing against all alternate hypotheses for variation in the fossil record.
 A study evaluating the utility of rare earth element profiles as proxies for biomolecular preservation in fossil bones, based on data from a specimen of Edmontosaurus annectens from the Standing Rock Hadrosaur Site (Hell Creek Formation; South Dakota, United States), is published by Ullmann et al. (2020).
 A study on the diversity and evolution of skull and jaw functions in sabre-toothed carnivores during the last 265 million years is published by Lautenschlager et al. (2020).

Other research
 Evidence indicating that the Great Oxidation Event predated Paleoproterozoic glaciation in Russia and snowball Earth deposits in South Africa is presented by Warke et al. (2020), who argue that their findings preclude hypotheses of Earth's oxygenation in which global glaciation preceded or caused the evolution of oxygenic photosynthesis.
 A study on the timing of the onset and termination of the Shuram carbon isotope excursion is published by Rooney et al. (2020), who argue that this excursion was divorced from the rise of the earliest preserved animal ecosystems.
 A study on the causes of the Late Ordovician mass extinction, based on data from the Ordovician-Silurian boundary stratotype (Dob's Linn, Scotland), is published by Bond & Grasby (2020), who interpret their findings as evidence that this extinction event was caused by volcanism, warming and anoxia.
 Evidence of wildfires at the Frasnian−Famennian boundary is reported from Upper Devonian sections from western New York (United States) by Liu et al. (2020), who also provide an estimate of atmospheric O2 levels at this interval, and evaluate their implications for the knowledge of causes of the Late Devonian extinction.
 A study on the timing of the environmental changes associated with the Kellwasser events is published by Da Silva et al. (2020).
 Evidence of anomalously high mercury concentration in marine deposits encompassing the Hangenberg event from Carnic Alps (Italy and Austria) is presented by Rakociński et al. (2020), who argue that methylmercury poisoning in otherwise anoxic seas, caused by extensive volcanic activity, could be a direct kill mechanism of the end-Devonian Hangenberg extinction.
 A study on fossil plant spores with malformed sculpture and pigmented walls, recovered from terrestrial Devonian-Carboniferous boundary sections from East Greenland, is published by Marshall et al. (2020), who interpret their findings as evidence that the terrestrial mass extinction at the Devonian-Carboniferous boundary coincided with elevated UV-B radiation, indicative of ozone layer reduction.
 Fields et al. (2020) attempt to determine whether the dramatic drop in stratospheric ozone coinciding with the end-Devonian extinction events was caused by a nearby supernova explosion.
 A series of articles on the biostratigraphy of the Karoo Supergroup, providing a formal biozonation scheme for the Stormberg Group and dividing the Beaufort and Stormberg groups into nine tetrapod assemblage zones, is published in the June 2020 issue of the South African Journal of Geology.
 A study on the age of a pristine ash-fall deposit in the Karoo Lystrosaurus Assemblage Zone (South Africa) is published by Gastaldo et al. (2020), who report that turnover from the Daptocephalus Assemblage Zone to Lystrosaurus AZ in this basin occurred over 300 ka before the end-Permian marine event, and interpret their findings as refuting the concurrentness of turnovers in terrestrial and marine ecosystems at the end of the Permian.
 A study evaluating the contribution of loss of ecosystems on land and consequent massive terrestrial biomass oxidation to atmosphere–ocean biogeochemistry at the Permian–Triassic boundary is published by Dal Corso et al. (2020).
 A study aiming to determine the mechanism that drove vast stretches of the ocean to an anoxic state during the Permian–Triassic extinction event is published by Schobben et al. (2020).
 Evidence indicating that the Permian–Triassic extinction event was linked with ocean acidification due to carbon degassing from the Siberian sill intrusions is presented by Jurikova et al. (2020).
 Evidence from paired coronene and mercury spikes in stratigraphic sections in south China and Italy, indicative of the occurrence of two pulsed volcanic eruption events coinciding with the initiation of the end-Permian terrestrial ecological disturbance and marine extinction, is presented by Kaiho et al. (2020).
 A study on variations of ~10-Myr scale monsoon dynamics during the early Mesozoic, and on their impact on climate and ecosystem dynamics (including the dispersal of early dinosaurs), is published by Ikeda, Ozaki & Legrand (2020).
 New geochronologic and paleoclimatic data from Carnian-aged strata in the Ischigualasto-Villa Unión Basin (Argentina) is presented by Mancuso et al. (2020), who interpret their findings as indicating that the Carnian Pluvial Event interval in western Gondwana was warmer and more humid than periods before or after this interval, confirming that the CPE was a global event.
 A study on the age of the top of the Moenkopi Formation, the lower Blue Mesa Member, and the lower and upper Sonsela Member of the Chinle Formation is published by Rasmussen et al. (2020), who argue that the biotic turnover preserved in the mid-Sonsela Member at the Petrified Forest National Park was a mid-Norian event.
 A study on ocean temperatures during the Triassic–Jurassic extinction event is published by Petryshyn et al. (2020), who report no evidence for short-term cooling or initial warming across the 1-80,000 years of the extinction event.
 Evidence of low ocean sulfate levels at the end-Triassic mass extinction, linked to rapid development of marine anoxia, is presented by He et al. (2020).
 A study on the causes of the negative organic carbon isotope excursion associated with the end-Triassic mass extinction, based on data from its type locality in the Bristol Channel Basin (United Kingdom), is published by Fox et al. (2020), who interpret this isotopic excursion as caused by an abrupt relative sea level drop rather than by massive inputs of exogenous light carbon into the atmosphere, and argue that the disappearance of marine biota at the type locality is the result of local environmental changes and does not mark the global extinction event, while the main extinction phase occurred slightly later in marine strata.
 Evidence of increasing atmospheric CO2 concentration at the onset of the end-Triassic extinction event, based on data from fossil leaves of the seed fern Lepidopteris ottonis from southern Sweden, is presented by Slodownik, Vajda & Steinthorsdottir (2020).
 A review of the geology, paleoecology and taxonomic status of the fauna from the Cretaceous Kem Kem Beds of Morocco is published by Ibrahim et al. (2020).
 Klages et al. (2020) report evidence from the West Antarctic shelf indicating the occurrence of a temperate lowland rainforest environment at a palaeolatitude of about 82° S during the Late Cretaceous (Turonian–Santonian).
 A review and revision of the stratigraphy of the Hell Creek Formation is published by Fowler (2020).
 A study on the timing of a volcanic outgassing at the end of the Cretaceous, and on its implications for the knowledge of causes of the Cretaceous-Paleogene mass extinction, is published by Hull et al. (2020).
 A study on paleosols from the eastern edge of the Deccan Volcanic Province (central India), evaluating their implications for reconstructions of climate and terrestrial environments of India before and after the Cretaceous–Paleogene extinction event and for the knowledge of causes of this extinction event, is published by Dzombak et al. (2020).
 A detailed record of molecular burn markers from the Chicxulub crater and in ocean sediments distant from the impact site is presented by Lyons et al. (2020), who interpret their findings as indicating rapid heating after the impact and a fossil carbon source, and argue that soot from the target rock immediately contributed to global cooling and darkening after the impact at the end of the Cretaceous.
 A study on the origin, recovery, and development of microbial life in the Chicxulub crater after the impact at the end of the Cretaceous, and on the environmental conditions in the crater up to ~4 million years after the Cretaceous–Paleogene extinction event, is published by Schaefer et al. (2020).
 A study on Earth's climate throughout the Cenozoic era, based on a highly resolved and well-dated record of benthic carbon and oxygen isotopes from deep-sea foraminifera, is published by Westerhold et al. (2020).
 Van Couvering & Delson (2020) define 17 African land mammal ages covering the Cenozoic record of the Afro-Arabian continent.
 A study on the amount and makeup of the carbon added to the ocean during the Paleocene–Eocene Thermal Maximum, based on geochemical data from planktic foraminifera, is published by Haynes & Hönisch (2020), who interpret their findings as indicating that volcanic emissions were the main carbon source responsible for PETM warming.
 Evidence from Eocene plant fossils from the Bangong-Nujiang suture indicating that the Tibetan Plateau area hosted a diverse subtropical ecosystem approximately 47 million years ago and that this area was both low and humid at the time is presented by Su et al. (2020).
 A study on the climate evolution across the Oligocene, examining the relationship between global temperatures and continental-scale polar ice sheets following the establishment of ice sheets on Antarctica, is published by O'Brien et al. (2020).
 A study aiming to test the hypothesis that the emergence of the Southeast Asian islands played a significant role in driving the cooling of Earth's climate since the Miocene Climatic Optimum is published by Park et al. (2020).
 A study on the environment at Olduvai Gorge at the emergence of the Acheulean technology 1.7 million years ago, based on data from fossil lipid biomarkers, is published by Sistiaga et al. (2020).
 A study on freshwater fauna and flora found in a sediment sample from the Yuka mammoth carcass, evaluating its implications for reconstructions of the waterbody type where the mammoth was preserved and for the knowledge of the nature of the waterbodies that existed in Beringia during the MIS3 climatic optimum, is published by Neretina et al. (2020).
 A study on the Neogene paleobotanical record and climate in the northernmost part of the Central Andean Plateau, based on data from the Descanso Formation (Peru), is published by Martínez et al. (2020), who report the earliest evidence of a puna-like ecosystem in the Pliocene and a montane ecosystem without modern analogs in the Miocene, as well as evidence of wetter paleoclimatic conditions than previously estimated by regional climate model simulations.
 A study on environmental changes in Southeast Asia from the Early Pleistocene to the Holocene, based on stable isotope data from Southeast Asian mammals, and on their impact on the evolution of mammals (including hominins), is published by Louys & Roberts (2020).
 A study on the climate variability in the southwest Indian Ocean area throughout the past ~8000 years, evaluating its implications for the knowledge of possible causes of extinction of megafauna from Madagascar and Mascarene Islands, is published by Li et al. (2020).
 Van Neer et al. (2020) report faunal remains from the Takarkori rock shelter in the Acacus Mountains region (Libya), and evaluate their implications for the knowledge of the climate and hydrography of the Sahara throughout the Holocene.
 New Mesozoic and Paleogene amber occurrences, preserving diverse inclusions of arthropods, plants and fungi, are reported from Australia and New Zealand by Stilwell et al. (2020).

References